Les têtes interverties, also known as La cravate, The Transposed Heads and The Severed Heads, is a 1957 French short film written and directed by Alejandro Jodorowsky, Saul Gilbert, and Ruth Michelly. Shot between 1953 and 1957, the film is a mime adaptation of Thomas Mann's 1940 novella The Transposed Heads (Die vertauschten Köpfe). The film stars surreal humorist Raymond Devos as well as Jodorowsky himself.

External links

1957 films
1950s fantasy films
French films based on plays
Films based on works by Thomas Mann
Films directed by Alejandro Jodorowsky
1950s French-language films
French short films
1950s French films